Mont-roig del Camp is a town and municipality in the comarca of Baix Camp in Catalonia.  It is in the middle of its comarca, between the Serra de Colldejou and the Mediterranean Sea. It includes two populated places: the historic town of Mont-roig del Camp in the interior, whose economy revolves round the cultivation of nuts and olives, and the beach resort of Miami Platja on the coast, the Costa Daurada.

The municipality has a long coastline, with campsites and a few hotels, informally distributed over the districts of Pins de Miramar and Miami Platja, as well as round the Platja de Rifà (Rifà beach), close to the district of Les Pobles.

Notable buildings include the "new" parish church, that of Sant Miquel, built in Gothic and Renaissance style between 1574 and 1610.

High above the town on a very eroded outcrop of rock stands the sanctuary of Our Lady of the Rock with the Sant Ramon chapel. The painter Joan Miró spent long periods at the family property of Mas d'en Miró, in the Les Pobles district, from 1911 onwards. It was a frequent subject in his early paintings, such as The Farm (1920–21) and The Tilled Field (1923-24).

References 

 Tomàs Bonell, Jordi Descobrir Catalunya, poble a poble, Barcelona: Premsa Catalana, 1994
 Article in the Gran Enciclopèdia Catalana (in Catalan)

External links 
 Town council website
 Tourism Board website
 Government data pages 

Municipalities in Baix Camp